Kristoffer-August Sundquist Klaesson (born 27 November 2000) is a Norwegian footballer who plays as a goalkeeper for English club Leeds United.

Klaesson was Vålerenga's youth academy graduate and plays for Norway at youth level.

Club career

Vålerenga
Klaesson signed his first professional contract in June 2016. He made his Eliteserien debut for Vålerenga on 30 June 2019 against Haugesund, following injury to first choice goalkeeper Adam Larsen Kwarasey. The game ended with a 4–1 win for Vålerenga. Klaesson also started the following game, a 6–0 win against Bodø/Glimt.

Leeds United
On 31 July 2021, Klaesson signed a four-year deal with Leeds United, with the club paying an undisclosed fee reported as £1.6 million.

He made his Premier League debut on 18 March 2022 in a 2-3 victory away to Wolverhampton Wanderers, following injury to first choice goalkeeper Illan Meslier. During his time on the pitch, he did not concede any goals.

Career statistics

Honors
Norway U17
Syrenka Cup: 2016

References

2000 births
Living people
Footballers from Oslo
Norwegian footballers
Norway youth international footballers
Norway under-21 international footballers
Association football goalkeepers
Vålerenga Fotball players
Leeds United F.C. players
Norwegian Second Division players
Premier League players
Eliteserien players
Norwegian expatriate footballers
Expatriate footballers in England
Norwegian expatriate sportspeople in England
Norwegian people of Swedish descent